Marzling is a municipality in the district of Freising in Bavaria in Germany.

References

External links
 

Freising (district)